Phagwara is a city and municipal corporation in the Kapurthala district of Punjab, India. The city is famous for sugar, glucose, starch, fine fabric textiles, and auto parts manufacturing for engines in Punjab. This place is also known for the Shri Hanuman Garhi Temple, which has statues of the Hindu God, Lord Hanuman.

Geography

Phagwara is located on land between the Beas and Satluj rivers and is a typical Doaba city.

Demographics
As per provisional data of 2011 census the Phagwara urban agglomeration had a population of 117,954, with 62,171 males and 55,783 females. The literacy rate was 87.43 per cent.
 India census,the city of Phagwara had a population of 97,864. Males constitute 54% of the population and females 46%. Phagwara has an average literacy rate of 81%, higher than the national average of 59.5%: male literacy is 80%, and female literacy is 73%. In Phagwara, 10% of the population is under 6 years of age.

Education
 Universities
Lovely Professional University
GNA University
 Colleges
Guru Nanak College
Pyramid college of business and technology
Kamla Nehru college for women.
Ramgarhia Institute of Engineering & Technology
Ramgarhia Polytechnic College, First Polytechnic of United Punjab (Since 1950)
Ramgarhia College of Education
Ramgarhia College
 Schools
Sant Sarwan Dass Model School Hadiabad,Phagwara
G.D.R convent senior secondary school
Government Senior Secondary School (Boys) known as J.J. School
Government Senior Secondary School (Girls)
Aman Public School
 Arya model senior secondary school
St. Joseph's Convent School 
Kamla Nehru Public School
 Swami Sant Dass Public School
Mele Singh Missionary School
Cambridge International School 
Saffron Public School
Tagore Public High School
Jain Model Senior Secondary School
Lord Mahavira Jain Public School
St. Sai Ram Sunrise High School
New Sunflower High School
Guru Harkrishan National Model Senior Secondary School
S.D. Model senior secondary School
MAA Ambay girls Senior secondary School
T.W.E.I. Senior Secondary School
Ramgarhia Senior Secondary School
Dehradoon international public school, Bhabiana
Ramgarhia ITI, Rampur Khalyan

Villages/Estates in Phagwara tehsil

Bhabiana
Nangal Majja
Kotli Khakhian
Madhopur
Indna Kalaske
Manawali
Sapror
Bhullarai
Chachoki
Brahampur, Phagwara
Lakhpur
Maheru
Jagpalpur
Ranipur
Palahi
Mayopatti
Narur
Panchhat, (A Parmar Rajput Estate)
Gandhwan
Athouli
Nihalgarh (Nawa Pind)
Jagat Pur Jattan
Thakarki
Pandwa
Sangatpur
Chak Prema
Dhadday
Dhadoli
Bir Dhadoli
Rawalpindi
Khatti
Rampur Sunra
Malikhpur
Domeli
Babeli
Prem Pura
Khera, Nangal
Bhanoki
Bir Puadh
Rehana Jattan
Khangura
Chak Hakim
Virk
Mouli
Chaheru
Ucha Pind
Hadiabad
Kotrani
Khalwara
Dhak Pandori
Balaloan Pind
Chak Hakim
Drawesh Pind
Balaloan Pind
Thakarki
Sahni
Rampur Sunran
Bir Khurampur

References

 Cities and towns in Kapurthala district